Baldomer Galofre i Giménez, in Spanish: Baldomero Galofré y Jiménez (25 May 1845 – 26 July 1902) was a Spanish painter.

Biography

Galofre was born in Reus. His first art lessons were in the workshop of the amateur painter and wine merchant, Domènec Soberano, when he was still quite young. Shortly after, his family moved to Barcelona, where he was enrolled at the Escola de la Llotja and studied with Ramon Martí Alsina. He later moved to Madrid to continue his studies.

His first exhibition was at the "Exposició de Belles Arts del 1866" in Barcelona, where he presented his work "Els traginers" (The Porters). He later participated in the Barcelona exhibitions of 1870 and 1872, as well as one in Zaragoza in 1868, where he presented a series of landscapes depicting the hills of Montjuïc and Vallvidrera as well as some maritime paintings. His watercolors won a silver medal at an exposition in Salamanca.

From 1870 to 1882, he lived in Rome on a pension, granted by the First Republic, while he studied at the "Academia Española de Bellas Artes de Roma", a branch of the Real Academia de Bellas Artes de San Fernando. At this time, he came under the influence of Marià Fortuny, but preserved his own style; especially his use of color.

His personal exhibition in Barcelona in 1884 was very popular. Narcís Oller praised his sense of naturalism and skill at history painting. At an exhibition in Madrid in 1890, one of his works was purchased by Queen María Cristina. In 1886, he became a regular contributor to the Sala Parés. His final work "El cavall més valent" (The Bravest Horse) was left unfinished at his death, but sold for 20,000 Pesetas. He died in Barcelona, aged 57.

Despite his reputation, his popularity quickly faded and a major retrospective at the Museu Municipal de Belles Arts de Barcelona (the predecessor of MNAC) in 1903 was poorly attended.

References

Further reading 
 Josep Iglésies, Baldomer Galofre Ximenis. Reus: Associació d'Estudis Reusencs, 1953
 DDAA, La col•lecció Raimon Casellas, 1992, Publicacions del MNAC/Museo del Prado, Catalog of the exposition held at the Palau Nacional between 28 July and 20 September 1992

External links 

 Arcadja Auctions: More works by Galofre

1845 births
1902 deaths
People from Reus
19th-century Spanish painters
Spanish male painters
Painters from Catalonia
19th-century Spanish male artists